Danseparc was Martha and the Muffins' fourth album, recorded in 1982 at Grant Avenue Studios in Hamilton, Ontario, Canada, and released in 1983. The title single reached #31 in Canada.

This long out-of-print album was reissued on CD through the band's own Muffin Music imprint in North America with a release date of June 25, 2008. Three additional bonus tracks include the original extended dance version of “Danseparc”, “These Dangerous Machines” and a live version of “Sins Of Children” from M&M’s performance at Ontario Place in 1983 featuring avant-guitarist Michael Brook.  On August 4, 2008, Cherry Records rereleased the album in the UK.
Bass player Jocelyne Lanois is the sister of producer Daniel Lanois.

Track listing

Personnel
Martha Johnson - guitar, keyboards, vocals
Mark Gane - guitar, keyboards, vocals
Jocelyne Lanois - bass
Nick Kent - drums, percussion

with:

Daniel Lanois -  treatments
Nick Gane - synthesizer, piano
Glenn Schellenberg - synthesizer
Dick Smith - percussion
Ron Allen - saxophone
John Oswald - saxophone
Debbie Griffiths - background vocals

References

1983 albums
Martha and the Muffins albums
Albums produced by Daniel Lanois
RCA Records albums